Freddie James Prinze Jr. (born March 8, 1976) is an American actor, television and film producer and screenwriter. He has starred in films such as I Know What You Did Last Summer (1997) and its sequel I Still Know What You Did Last Summer (1998), She's All That (1999), Summer Catch (2001), Scooby-Doo (2002), and its sequel Scooby-Doo 2: Monsters Unleashed (2004). Prinze has also had recurring and starring roles in television shows, including Friends (2002), Boston Legal (2004), Freddie (2005–06) and 24 (2010). He voiced Kanan Jarrus in the Disney XD series Star Wars Rebels. He is the only child of comedian and actor Freddie Prinze.

Early life
Freddie James Prinze Jr. was born in Los Angeles on March 8, 1976, the only child of Katherine Elaine Prinze (née Cochran) and actor and stand-up comedian Freddie Prinze. On January 29, 1977, Freddie Prinze died of a self-inflicted gunshot wound, after which Prinze Jr. relocated with his mother to Albuquerque, New Mexico. He was raised Catholic, embraces his partial  Latino ancestry (as his paternal grandmother was Puerto Rican, from Boquerón), and is fluent in Spanish. By the age of 15, he was inspired to get into show business after his dying grandfather told him he needed to "fix" what his father had "f'd up." Soon after that he saw Neil Patrick Harris at his high school getting kids excited about getting into acting, and he decided to do that. After graduating from high school in 1994, Prinze moved to Los Angeles to audition for television roles.

Career

Television and film
Prinze was cast in a guest role on the ABC TV series Family Matters in 1995. He then appeared in a few programs and made-for-TV movies, before making his motion picture debut in To Gillian on Her 37th Birthday in 1996. In subsequent years, Prinze appeared in youth-oriented movies I Know What You Did Last Summer (1997) and its sequel I Still Know What You Did Last Summer (1998), made him known to teenage audiences. His first leading role, the romantic comedy She's All That (1999), grossed $63 million in the United States.

Subsequently, he had leading roles in Wing Commander (1999), Down to You (2000), Boys and Girls (2000), Head over Heels (2001), and Summer Catch (2001), most of which were disliked by critics and had moderate box office success.

He played Fred Jones in the 2002 live-action film version of the popular cartoon Scooby-Doo, and reprised the role in the 2004 sequel, Scooby-Doo 2: Monsters Unleashed, both alongside his wife Sarah Michelle Gellar and along with Matthew Lillard and Linda Cardellini. He guest starred on the popular NBC show Friends as a sensitive male nanny named Sandy on the series' 200th episode. He also appeared as Donny Crane, a character believed to be Denny Crane's son in the ABC legal drama-comedy Boston Legal. Prinze starred in his own television sitcom, titled Freddie. The sitcom is said to depict some actual events from his life, and was cancelled after one season in May 2006. He guest starred on George Lopez for a crossover with Freddie. In 2004, Prinze accepted a special award from TV Land on behalf of his late father. He thanked his father's former co-star Della Reese for her continued advice and support. In 2006, he lent his voice to the character of Pi in the computer-animated film Shark Bait. Also in 2007, he lent his voice to the character of Rick in Happily N'Ever After along with his wife Gellar, Wallace Shawn, Andy Dick, George Carlin, and Sigourney Weaver. In 2008, he auditioned for Jigsaw in Punisher: War Zone, but was not given the part at the decision of Lionsgate Studios. He later was the voice of the titular character in the animated movie Delgo. In 2010, Prinze guest starred on Psych as Dennis, a grade school friend of Shawn Spencer and Burton Guster. In March 2019, Prinze was cast as Nancy Drew's father, Carson Drew, in The CW mystery pilot Nancy Drew, but was later replaced by Scott Wolf. He also voiced the future version of Tim and Jim Possible in the Kim Possible movie Kim Possible: A Sitch in Time.

In March 2009, it was announced that Prinze had signed on to star as Bradley, aka Ultimatum, in the ABC show No Heroics, a U.S. remake of the British show of the same name. The show was not picked up, but Prinze was cast as a series regular for the eighth season of the television show 24; he played Cole Ortiz, a new CTU operative.

In 2021, Prinze joined the reboot of Punky Brewster on Peacock, playing the title character's ex-husband.

Other work
He voiced a pilot in a Vatta's War: Trading in Danger graphic audio book. Prinze voiced different characters in BioWare video games: Lieutenant James Vega in Mass Effect 3 and The Iron Bull in Dragon Age: Inquisition. He returned to the role of James Vega again for the animated feature film Mass Effect: Paragon Lost, dubbed by FUNimation. From 2014 until 2018, he was the voice of Kanan Jarrus, one of the last surviving Jedi Knights, on the Disney XD series Star Wars Rebels. He reprised the role for the opening scene of the pilot episode of the Disney+ series The Bad Batch in May 2021.

Professional wrestling

Work with WWE (2008–2009, 2010–2012)
Prinze is a WWE fan and was seen on television in attendance at the March 2008 WrestleMania XXIV pay-per-view and its preceding Hall of Fame ceremony. He also made a cameo on an episode of The Dirt Sheet, an online program hosted by wrestlers John Morrison and The Miz. He had created an official profile on WWE's "Universe" blog community where he would regularly write his thoughts about the current goings-on in the world of the WWE. His relationship with the company was furthered when he was hired as a member of the creative staff to contribute to weekly television and pay-per-view programming for the SmackDown brand. It was reported on February 22, 2009 that Prinze and WWE had parted ways. In January 2021, Prinze explained that he had actually chosen to leave the company at that time.

On August 17, Prinze appeared on Raw as a special guest host, where he was assaulted by then WWE Champion Randy Orton after refusing to bail Orton out of his tag team match with John Cena, who was due to challenge him in the upcoming SummerSlam. Prinze later returned to the program and got his payback during Orton's match with Cena against Big Show and Chris Jericho, by setting up a lumberjack match involving Mark Henry, Primo, Evan Bourne, Kofi Kingston, MVP, and Jamie Noble.

Prinze returned to WWE on October 1, 2010 in a role as a producer and director. On the November 1, 2010 episode of Monday Night Raw, Prinze made an on-screen appearance as Vince McMahon's doctor, a dream sequence scene that coincided with Linda McMahon's attempt to win a seat in the Senate for the state of Connecticut. Prinze left WWE for a second time due to a comment made by Stone Cold Steve Austin to a contestant while taping an episode of the fifth season of WWE Tough Enough.

Podcast (2021–Present)
In November 2021, Prinze started his own podcast Wrestling With Freddie.

Personal life

Prinze married actress Sarah Michelle Gellar on September 1, 2002, in Puerto Vallarta, Jalisco, Mexico. The couple met several years before, while filming I Know What You Did Last Summer (1997), started dating in 2000 and were engaged in April 2001. They also co-starred in Scooby-Doo (2002), Scooby-Doo 2: Monsters Unleashed (2004), Happily N'Ever After (2006), and Star Wars Rebels (2014–2018). Gellar also made a non-speaking cameo in Prinze's film She's All That. They have two children together: a daughter born September 2009, and a son born September 2012, and live in Los Angeles.

Prinze is an avid practitioner of Brazilian Jiu-Jitsu and has reached the rank of purple belt in the sport, having been promoted under Jean Jacques Machado.

Filmography

Film

Television

Video games

Awards and nominations

See also

 List of Puerto Ricans

References

External links

 
 

1976 births
Living people
20th-century American male actors
21st-century American male actors
21st-century American male writers
American film producers
American male film actors
American male screenwriters
American male television actors
American male television writers
American male video game actors
American male voice actors
American people of German descent
American people of Italian descent
American people of Puerto Rican descent
American podcasters
American practitioners of Brazilian jiu-jitsu
American television writers
Film producers from California
Hispanic and Latino American male actors
Hispanic and Latino American writers
La Cueva High School alumni
Male actors from Albuquerque, New Mexico
Male actors from California
Male actors from Los Angeles
Male actors from New Mexico
People from Albuquerque, New Mexico
People from Los Angeles
Professional wrestling writers
Screenwriters from California
Screenwriters from New Mexico
Television producers from California
Writers from Albuquerque, New Mexico
Writers from Los Angeles